Hollingsworth is a surname of English origin. Notable people with the surname include:

 Adam Hollingsworth (born 1969), US politician
 Al Hollingsworth (disambiguation), several people
 Alvin Hollingsworth (1928 – 2000), US painter
 Andrew Hollingsworth (born 1979), English cricketer
 Ben Hollingsworth (actor) (born 1984), Canadian actor
 Ben Hollingsworth (soccer) (born 1982), US soccer player
 Bonnie Hollingsworth (1895 – 1990), US baseball player
 David Hollingsworth (1844 – 1929), US congressman
 Dean Hollingsworth (born 1961), Guernsey actor
 Dennis Hollingsworth (born 1967), US politician
 Don Hollingsworth (born 1932), Canadian football player
 Elaine Hollingsworth (born 1928), US actress
 Ellery Hollingsworth, snowboarder
 George Hollingsworth (1813 – 1882), US artist
 J. Rogers Hollingsworth (born 1932), American historian and sociologist
 Joe E. Hollingsworth (1908 – 1975), US politician
 John D. Hollingsworth (1917 – 2000), textile machinery executive
 Jon Hollingsworth (1977 – 2006), English soldier
 Joy Hollingsworth (born 1984), American basketball player, coach and entrepreneur
 Katherine Hollingsworth (born 1960), American politician from Missouri 
 Kim Hollingsworth (born 1966), Australian stripper and police officer
 Kyle Hollingsworth (born 1968), US musician
 Mark Hollingsworth Jr. (born 1954), US bishop
 Matt Hollingsworth (born 1968), US artist
 Mellisa Hollingsworth-Richards (born 1980), Canadian athlete
 Mike Hollingsworth (animator) (fl 2006), US animator and comedian
 Mike Hollingsworth (TV executive) (fl 1998 – 2009), British TV executive
 Paul Hollingsworth, Canadian sports reporter
 Quanitra Hollingsworth (born 1988), American-Turkish female basketballer
 Romero Hollingsworth (born 1987), Dutch footballer
 Roy Hollingsworth (born 1933), Trinidadian athlete
 Ruth Hollingsworth (1880 – 1945), British artist
 Shawn Hollingsworth (born 1961), American football player
 Simon Hollingsworth (born 1972), Australian athlete
 Stanley Hollingsworth (1924 – 2003), US composer
 Taylor Hollingsworth (born 1983), US musician
 Timothy Hollingsworth (born 1980), US chef
 Tony Hollingsworth (fl 1988), British impresario
 Valentine Hollingsworth (1632–1710), Irish-born early American settler
Will Hollingsworth born 1986 Owner Spotted Owl-Cleveland’s Best Tiki Bar
 William R. Hollingsworth Jr. (1910–1944), American painter

 Dudley Hollingsworth Bowen Jr. (born 1941), US judge
 Hollingsworth Morse (1910 – 1988), US film and TV director
 Anne Hollingsworth Wharton (1845 – 1928), US historian

See also
 Baker-Devotie-Hollingsworth Block, Des Moines, Iowa
 Fort Hollingsworth-White House, Georgia
 Hollingsworth, Georgia, community in Banks County
 Hollingsworth Glacier, Antarctica
 Hollingsworth House, Indianapolis
 Lake Hollingsworth, Florida
 Hollingsworth Park (disambiguation)
 Mount Hollingsworth, Antarctica
 Bourne & Hollingsworth, UK department store
 Harlan and Hollingsworth, Delaware firm
Harlan and Hollingsworth Office Building
Harland and Hollingsworth Company
 Harrington–Hollingsworth experiment
 Hollingsworth v. Perry, legal case
 Hollingsworth v. Virginia, legal case
 Rex, Georgia, also known as Hollingsworth
Hollingworth (disambiguation)

English-language surnames
Surnames of English origin